Craig Bland (born May 5, 1959) is an American politician who served in the Missouri House of Representatives from the 43rd district from 2001 to 2009.

References

1959 births
Living people
Democratic Party members of the Missouri House of Representatives